This partial list comprises some of the Odonata species which occur in Morais Natura 2000 Site (PTCON0023) located in the northeast of Portugal.

The list is in taxonomic order. The common name of each species is given, followed by its scientific name.

List

Suborder Zygoptera (damselflies)
Family Calopterygidae (demoiselles)

Family Lestidae (emerald damselflies)

Family Coenagrionidae (blue, blue-tailed, and red damselflies)

Suborder Anisoptera (dragonflies)

Family Gomphidae (club-tailed dragonflies)

Family Aeshnidae (hawkers and emperors)

Family Cordulegastridae (golden-ringed dragonflies)

Family Libellulidae (chasers, skimmers, and darters)

See also 
 Morais Ophiolite Complex
 Morais Natura 2000 Site
 Azibo Reservoir Protected Landscape
 Macedo de Cavaleiros Municipality
 Morais (Macedo de Cavaleiros)
 List of Birds of Azibo Reservoir Protected Landscape

References

External links 
  Odonata Species in Portugal

Odonata
Portugal
Morais Natura 2000 Site